Arturia darwinii is a species of calcareous sponge in the family Clathrinidae found on the Sunda Shelf. The species is named after the English naturalist Charles Darwin.

References

World Register of Marine Species entry

Clathrina
Sponges described in 1870